The  HTC HD7  (also known as the HTC Schubert,  HTC HD3), is a smartphone running the Windows Phone OS operating system. The phone was designed and manufactured by HTC. It is the successor to the HTC HD2, and it has a special variant which is the HTC HD7S.

Description
The HTC HD7 was announced at the Windows Phone event in New York City on 11 October 2010.

Leaked photographs prior to the launch of the HD7 indicated that the HD7 was originally named the HD3. It is possible that HTC changed the name of the product before launch so as to tie in with the Windows Phone brand.

Also announced March 2011, was the HD7S, which is largely identical, but with a Super LCD screen.

The HD7 shares nearly all its specifications with its older Windows Mobile 6.5-running brother, the HD2, including the screen resolution and size (109 mm diagonal and WVGA 800x480 resolution).

HTC HD7S
The HTC HD7S is a special variation of the HTC HD7 available exclusively to AT&T. Unlike the original HTC HD7 which has a TFT-LCD, the HTC HD7S has Super-LCD screen.
The HTC HD7S's Super LCD screen is brighter and more vivid than the original TFT-LCD screen on the HD7.

See also
Windows Phone
HTC HD2 – The predecessor of the HD7, with mostly similar specifications.
HTC Touch HD – The predecessor of the HD2.
HTC HD Mini – A miniature of the HD2.
HTC Touch
HTC Touch family
HTC Titan – the successor of the HD7.

References

External links
Official HTC HD7 homepage
 Microsofts Windows Phone 7 Device Overview
 HD7 Users Group
 HD7 Forums on XDA-Developers.com
 Review HTC HD7 on TheINQUIRER.net
 Review HTC HD7 on engadget.com
 Review HTC HD7 on techradar.com
 Review HTC HD7 on V3.co.uk

Windows Phone devices
HTC smartphones
Mobile phones introduced in 2010
Mobile phones with user-replaceable battery